Dominik Galić (born 29 May 1975) is a Croatian swimmer. He competed in the men's 200 metre butterfly event at the 1996 Summer Olympics.

References

1975 births
Living people
Croatian male swimmers
Olympic swimmers of Croatia
Swimmers at the 1996 Summer Olympics
Swimmers from Zagreb
Male butterfly swimmers
20th-century Croatian people
21st-century Croatian people